Christ Church Meadow is a flood-meadow and popular walking and picnic spot in Oxford, England.

Roughly triangular in shape, it is bounded by the River Thames (the stretch through Oxford being known as "The Isis"), the River Cherwell, and Christ Church. The meadow provides access to many of the college boathouses, which are on an island at the confluence of the two rivers. The lower sections of the meadow, close to the Thames, are grazed by cattle (including Longhorn cows) while the upper sections have sports fields. Broad Walk is at the northern edge with Merton Field to the north and Merton College, dominated by the tower of Merton College Chapel, beyond that. 

Christ Church Meadow is owned by Christ Church, and is thus the private property of the college; however, access is allowed during the day. Access starts very early to allow rowers to go to the boathouses. Eights Week and Torpids, Oxford University's two main rowing events, and Christ Church Regatta are held on the Thames here. In past times, ornamental wooden barges were moored on the river here to store boats and house spectators. However, these have all now been replaced by boathouses.

The meadow can be accessed from St Aldate's to the northwest via Broad Walk through the Christ Church War Memorial Garden, from the north in Merton Street via Grove Walk and Merton Walk, and from the eastern end of the High Street via Rose Lane near the Oxford Botanic Garden to the northeast. There is also less-used access from near the Head of the River public house by Folly Bridge on the River Thames to the southwest, connecting to Poplar Walk (created by Henry Liddell in 1872) and the path by the river. All entrances are via railinged gates that are locked at night.

James Sadler made the first ascent in a balloon by an Englishman from the Meadow on 4 October 1784. The balloon rose to a height of around 3,600 feet and landed six miles away near the village of Wood Eaton near Islip to the northeast of Oxford. A plaque notes the event. The Meadow was also the location where the medieval royal pretender John Deydras claimed to have been persuaded by the devil to impersonate Edward II in 1318.

Postwar development planned for central Oxford included a relief road passing through the meadow and joining the district of St Ebbe's. The proposal was finally defeated in 1971 after vigorous opposition.

Gallery

References

Further reading

External links

 Christ Church Meadow information from Christ Church, Oxford

 
Parks and open spaces in Oxford
Parks and open spaces on the River Thames
University of Oxford sites
Water-meadows
Meadow
Grasslands of the United Kingdom
Meadows in Oxfordshire